Akhyar Nasution (born 21 July 1966) is an Indonesian politician who served as mayor of Medan between 2019 and 2021, mostly as an acting mayor to replace his predecessor Dzulmi Eldin.

Biography
Nasution was born on 21 July 1966 in Medan, and completed his basic education there. He studied engineering at the University of North Sumatra, where he obtained his bachelor's degree in 1996, and later a masters and a doctorate also from the same university. He initially began studying physics, but dropped out and briefly worked as a laboratory staff at a cooking oil factory before returning to his studies in 1988. Following his bachelors, he began working at a construction company as a designer and supervisor.

In 1999, he was elected into Medan's city council as a PDI-P candidate until 2004. After his term in the legislature, he became self-employed until 2016, when he was elected as Medan's vice-mayor along with Dzulmi Eldin.

On 17 October 2019, Nasution was appointed as acting mayor of Medan following the arrest of Eldin for corruption. He would remain as acting mayor for nearly the entirety of the remaining mayoral term, although he was officially sworn in as mayor on 11 February 2021, six days prior to the mayoral term's expiry on 17 February.

Nasution had attempted to run for a second term in the 2020 mayoral election, but he was defeated by Bobby Nasution. He had been removed from PDI-P for opposing Bobby's candidacy (which competed with his own), and hence he ran with the support of Demokrat and PKS.

Notes

References

1966 births
Living people
People from Medan
Democratic Party (Indonesia) politicians
Mayors of Medan
University of North Sumatra alumni